Monte Caçador and Pico Forcado Protected Countryside (Portuguese: Paisagem protegido de Monte Caçador e Pico Forcado) is a protected area covering  of land in the eastern part of the island of Boa Vista in Cape Verde. It is the most important mountain formation on the island, but not the highest.

The alignment of the peaks forms a tiny mountain range that consists  Monte Caçador (Pico Forcado and the lower Mesa Cágado. The rock formation consists of phonolitic deposits over the basaltic Fundo de Figueiras Formation.

See also
List of mountains in Cape Verde

References

External links
 Protected areas of Cape Verde 
Protected areas in the island of Boa Vista - Municipality of Boa Vista 

Cacador Forcado
Cacador Forcado